In mathematics – specifically, in functional analysis – a Bochner-measurable function taking values in a Banach space is a function that equals almost everywhere the limit of a sequence of measurable countably-valued functions, i.e.,

where the functions  each have a countable range and for which the pre-image  is measurable for each element x.  The concept is named after Salomon Bochner.

Bochner-measurable functions are sometimes called strongly measurable, -measurable or just measurable (or uniformly measurable in case that the Banach space is the space of continuous linear operators between Banach spaces).

Properties

The relationship between measurability and weak measurability is given by the following result, known as Pettis' theorem or Pettis measurability theorem.

Function f is almost surely separably valued (or essentially separably valued) if there exists a subset N ⊆ X with μ(N) = 0 such that f(X \ N) ⊆ B is separable.

A function f  : X → B defined on a measure space (X, Σ, μ) and taking values in a Banach space B is (strongly) measurable (with respect to Σ and the Borel algebra on B) if and only if it is both weakly measurable and almost surely separably valued. 

In the case that B is separable, since any subset of a separable Banach space is itself separable, one can take N above to be empty, and it follows that the notions of weak and strong measurability agree when B is separable.

See also

References

 .

Functional analysis
Measure theory
Types of functions